Nguyễn Thị Lệ Dung (born September 9, 1985 in Hanoi, Vietnam) is a Vietnamese fencer. She competed at the 2016 Summer Olympics in the women's sabre event, in which she was eliminated in the round of 32 by Kim Ji-yeon.

References

External links
 

1985 births
Living people
Sportspeople from Hanoi
Vietnamese female sabre fencers
Olympic fencers of Vietnam
Fencers at the 2016 Summer Olympics
Fencers at the 2006 Asian Games
Fencers at the 2014 Asian Games
Southeast Asian Games medalists in fencing
Southeast Asian Games gold medalists for Vietnam
Competitors at the 2003 Southeast Asian Games
Competitors at the 2005 Southeast Asian Games
Competitors at the 2007 Southeast Asian Games
Competitors at the 2011 Southeast Asian Games
Competitors at the 2015 Southeast Asian Games
Asian Games competitors for Vietnam
21st-century Vietnamese women
20th-century Vietnamese women